Martin v. Hunter's Lessee, 14 U.S. (1 Wheat.) 304 (1816), was a landmark decision of the Supreme Court of the United States decided on March 20, 1816. It was the first case to assert ultimate Supreme Court authority over state courts in civil matters of federal law.

Facts
During the American Revolution, the Commonwealth of Virginia enacted legislation that allowed it to confiscate Loyalists' property. Land owned by a loyalist, Martin, part of the Northern Neck Property, was confiscated by the State and transferred to David Hunter. The Treaty of Paris (1783) between Great Britain and the United States nullified such confiscations, permitting Martin to sue for the return of the property. The trial court ruled in  his favor, but the Virginia Supreme Court upheld the confiscation. The court did not rule that Virginia law was superior to U.S. treaties, but held that the treaty did not cover the dispute in question. On review in Fairfax's Devisee v. Hunter's Lessee, 11 U.S. 603 (1813), the U.S. Supreme Court disagreed with this conclusion, ruling that the treaty did in fact cover the dispute, and remanded the case back to the Virginia Supreme Court. The Virginia court in turn decided that the U.S. Supreme Court did not have authority over cases originating in state court:

The Court is unanimously of opinion, that the appellate power of the Supreme Court of the United States does not extend to this Court, under a sound construction of the Constitution of the United States; that so much of the 25th section of the act of Congress to establish the judicial courts of the United States, as extends the appellate jurisdiction of the Supreme Court to this Court, is not in pursuance of the Constitution of the United States; that the writ of error in this cause was improvidently allowed under the authority of that act; that the proceedings thereon in the Supreme Court were coram non judice in relation to this Court, and that obedience to its mandate be declined by the Court.

The U.S. Supreme Court reversed the state court's decision on appeal, ruling that questions of federal law were within its jurisdiction, and thereby establishing its own supremacy in matters of constitutional interpretation.

Though Chief Justice John Marshall wrote most of the Supreme Court opinions during his tenure, he did not write this opinion.  Marshall instead recused himself, citing a conflict of interest due to his relatives' interest in the property. Justice Joseph Story wrote the decision for a unanimous court.

Judgment
Story first confronted the argument that federal judicial power came from the states, and therefore that the Supreme Court had no right to overrule a state's interpretation of the treaty without its consent.  Story found that it was clear from history and the preamble of the Constitution that the federal power was given directly by the people and not by the states.

Story then cited Article III, Section 2, Clause 2, showing a textual commitment to allow Supreme Court judicial review of state decisions:

If the Supreme Court could not review the decisions of the highest state court, state courts would be excluded from ever hearing a case involving a federal question. Thus, because it was established that the states had the power to rule on federal issues it must be true that the Supreme Court can review the decision, or the Supreme Court would not have appellate jurisdiction in "all other cases" as stated by the Constitution.

Furthermore, the Supremacy Clause declares that federal interpretation trumps the state's interpretation. Story rejected concerns over State judicial sovereignty. Under Article I, Section 10 of the Constitution specific limits are placed upon the "sovereignty" of state governments. The Supreme Court could already review state executive and legislative decisions and this case was no different.

Story then confronted the argument that state judges were bound to uphold the Constitution just as federal judges were, and so denying state interpretations presumed that the state judges would less than faithfully interpret the Constitution.  Story countered that even if state judges were not biased, the issue was not bias but uniformity in federal law.  Furthermore, the legislative power to remove a case to federal court would be inadequate for maintaining this uniformity. Finally, Story applied these principles of judicial review to the decisions below and found that the state court's decision was in error.

Story said the following in his judgment:

The vote tally was 6 to 0, with Johnson giving a concurring opinion.

See also
 Cohens v. Virginia,  (a parallel case raising the issue of federal judicial review of state criminal, as opposed to civil, matters)
 Barron v. Baltimore (1833)
 List of United States Supreme Court cases, volume 14
 Jurisdiction stripping
 Treaty of Paris (1783)
 Jay Treaty

References

F. Thornton Miller, "John Marshall Versus Spencer Roane: A Reevaluation of Martin v. Hunter's Lessee," Virginia Magazine of History and Biography 96 (July 1988): 297-314.
Jean Edward Smith, John Marshall: Definer Of A Nation, New York: Henry Holt & Company, 1996.
Jean Edward Smith, The Constitution And American Foreign Policy, St. Paul, MN: West Publishing Company, 1989.

External links

 Case Brief for Martin v. Hunter's Lessee at Lawnix.com

United States Constitution Article Three case law
United States Supreme Court cases of the Marshall Court
1816 in United States case law
United States federalism case law
Legal history of Virginia
Northern Neck
Virginia in the American Revolution
United States Supreme Court cases